He Yanzhu (born January 5, 1982 in Qinhuangdao, Hebei) is a male Chinese judoka who competed at the 2008 Summer Olympics in the Middleweight (81–90 kg) event.

Major performances
2005 National Games - 3rd;
2006 National Championships/National Champions Tournament - 1st;
2007 Birmingham World Cup - 5th -90 kg class

See also
China at the 2008 Summer Olympics

References
 http://2008teamchina.olympic.cn/index.php/personview/personsen/586

1982 births
Living people
Judoka at the 2008 Summer Olympics
Olympic judoka of China
People from Qinhuangdao
Sportspeople from Hebei
Judoka at the 2006 Asian Games
Judoka at the 2010 Asian Games
Chinese male judoka
Asian Games competitors for China
21st-century Chinese people